Yusneysi Santiusti Caballero (born 24 December 1984) is an Italian middle-distance runner competing primarily in the 800 metres. She competed at the 2016 European Athletics Championships.

Competition record

See also
Italian all-time top lists - 800 m

References

External links
 

1984 births
Living people
Italian female middle-distance runners
Cuban female middle-distance runners
Cuban emigrants to Italy
Naturalised citizens of Italy
Athletes from Havana
Athletes (track and field) at the 2016 Summer Olympics
Olympic athletes of Italy
Athletes (track and field) at the 2018 Mediterranean Games
Central American and Caribbean Games medalists in athletics
Mediterranean Games competitors for Italy